Brandon Armstrong (born June 5, 1994) is an American professional dancer. He is currently a professional dancer and choreographer on Dancing with the Stars.

Early life 
Armstrong was born and raised in California. He moved to Utah and began dancing at age 12. He trained with Mark Ballas, Corky Ballas, and Shirley Ballas.

Dancing with the Stars 
Armstrong started working on Dancing with the Stars as a troupe member on season 24. He remained in that role until season 26. He had been on tour four times for the show. He became a pro in season 27.

In season 27, he was partnered with singer Tinashe. They were eliminated week 4, finishing in 10th place.

In season 28, he was partnered with The Supremes singer Mary Wilson. They were eliminated in the second week of competition, finishing in last place.

In season 29, he was partnered with television host Jeannie Mai. The couple made it to week 7, but they withdrew from the competition the day of week 8 due to Mai being hospitalized for epiglottitis.

In season 30, he was partnered with actress Kenya Moore. They were eliminated week 6, finishing in 10th place.

In season 31, he was partnered with singer-songwriter & actress Jordin Sparks. They were eliminated in week 7, finishing in 9th place.

Season 27 
Celebrity partner: Tinashe

Season 28 
Celebrity partner: Mary Wilson

Season 29 
Celebrity partner: Jeannie Mai

Season 30 
Celebrity partner: Kenya Moore

1 Derek Hough was absent so score was given out of 30.

Season 31 
Celebrity partner: Jordin Sparks

1 Score given by guest judge Michael Buble.

Personal life 
Armstrong got engaged to his girlfriend, Brylee Ivers, in March 2022. They got married on July 30, 2022.

References 



1994 births
Living people
American male dancers